Leland is an unincorporated community in Jefferson County, in the U.S. state of Washington.

History
A post office called Leland was established in 1881, and remained in operation until 1959. The community's name was phonetically derived from the first letters of each of the names of one Laura E. Andrews, an early settler.

References

Unincorporated communities in Jefferson County, Washington
Unincorporated communities in Washington (state)